Glass Onion: A Knives Out Mystery (titled onscreen as simply Glass Onion) is a 2022 American mystery film written and directed by Rian Johnson and produced by Johnson and Ram Bergman. It is a standalone sequel to the 2019 film Knives Out, with Daniel Craig reprising his role as master detective Benoit Blanc as he takes on a new case revolving around tech billionaire Miles Bron (played by Edward Norton) and his closest friends. The ensemble cast also includes Janelle Monáe, Kathryn Hahn, Leslie Odom Jr., Jessica Henwick, Madelyn Cline, Kate Hudson, and Dave Bautista.

Glass Onion: A Knives Out Mystery premiered at the Toronto International Film Festival on September 10, 2022, and began streaming on Netflix on December 23, after a one-week limited theatrical release on November 23. Made on a production budget of $40 million, Glass Onion grossed $15million. On the review aggregator website Rotten Tomatoes, the film holds an approval rating of 92% based on 389 reviews.

The film has received various awards and nominations. Glass Onion: A Knives Out Mystery garnered two Golden Globe nominations at the 80th ceremony. At the 95th Academy Awards, the film received a Best Adapted Screenplay nomination. It was named one of the ten best films of 2022 by the National Board of Review.

Accolades

Notes

References

External links 
 

Knives Out
Lists of accolades by film